Lake Tahoe is a lake on Victoria Island. Slightly to its east lies Washburn Lake.

References

Tahoe
Victoria Island (Canada)